Hugues may refer to

People:
 Hugues de Payens (c. 1070–1136), French soldier 
 Hugues I de Lusignan (1194/95 –1218), French-descended ruler a.k.a. Hugh I of Cyprus
 Hugues IV de Berzé (1150s–1220), French soldier 
 Hugues II de Lusignan (1252/53 –1267), French-descended ruler a.k.a. Hugh II of Cyprus

Other:
 Hugues (given name) and people bearing it

See also
 Hugh (disambiguation)
 Hughes (disambiguation)
 Huguette, a French given name
 Huw, a Welsh given name